The Great Mosque of Asmara; alternately known as Al Kulafah Al Rashidan, Al Kulafah Al Rashidin, Al Kuaka Al Rashidin or Al Khulafa Al Rashiudin; , "Mosque of the Rightly-Guided Caliphs") is a mosque located in the center of Asmara, the capital city of Eritrea. It is considered to be one of the three prominent edifices of the city, along with Church of Our Lady of the Rosary and Enda Mariam Coptic Cathedral. Designed by Guido Ferrazza, it was built in 1938 on the initiative of Benito Mussolini, to impress the Muslim population, who make up about 50% of the locality. The Arabic phrase al-Khulafā’ ar-Rāshidīn can mean "followers of the right path".

History 
Completed in 1936, this huge complex is a combination of rational, classical and Islamic styles. However, the interior of the mosque is open to Muslims only, but people of all faiths are allowed to enter through the main entrance.

Features
The mosque was designed by Guido Ferrazza, in a blend of the architectural styles of Rationalist, Classical, and Islamic. The minaret at its end, fluted and of Roman design, is visible from all parts of the city. It has two platforms and two balconies of the Italian rococo or late baroque style. Below the minaret, the mosque's fascia has a neoclassical loggia (exterior galleries), which is split in three parts. The building's double columns are made from Dekemhare travertine and are fitted with capitals made of Carrara marble. Other features include Islamic domes and arches. The mosque's miḥrāb (a niche which faces the direction of Mecca) is made of Carrara marble. Additional marble from the same quarry is used in other areas of this mosque. The front open yard of the mosque is covered with black stone slabs set in geometrical design.

The Eritrean mosque serves as a symbol of national unity for the country's 42% Sunni Muslims. Sunni Muslims from different parts of the country regularly come to the mosque for prayers, and the participation is significant during the month of Ramadan and the Friday prayers.

See also
 Lists of mosques
 List of mosques in Africa
 Mosque of the Companions, Massawa

References

Bibliography

Mosques in Eritrea
Buildings and structures in Asmara
Mosques completed in 1938
Modernist architecture in Eritrea
asmara